Constantijn L'Empereur (July 1591 – June 1648) was a prominent Dutch Hebraist, a distinguished Orientalist and doctor of theology.

Biography
He was born in July 1591 in Bremen, Germany, to where his parents had fled from Belgium to escape religious persecution. He acquired great reputation for his knowledge of the oriental languages. He was also an able lawyer and divine and took his degree of doctor in the latter faculty. He studied the oriental languages under Drusius and Erpenius and after having been professor of theology and Hebrew at Harderwijk for eight years was in 1627 made professor of Hebrew at Leyden on which occasion he delivered an harangue on the dignity and utility of the Hebrew language and it was his constant endeavour to diffuse a knowledge of that language and of the Arabic and Syriac among his countrymen that they might be the better enabled to combat the objections of the Jews to the Christian religion. He translated and published several editions of the popular ‘Travels of Rabbi Benjamin ben Jonah’, one Latin-Hebrew Edition with and another one without notes, one Hebrew Edition at Bale, which his Friends – the Buxdorffs – sent to Joseph Scaliger who mentioned it favorably in a letter, which was included in a version of Benjamins Travels, printed in 1666 in Amsterdam, collated with a Dutch translation of the Bara, together with a text from the celebrated rabbi Manassah ben Israel. The Emperor-edition of Rabbi Benjamin of Tudela Itinerary was the bases for a popular German and French translation in the 17th and 18th Century.

In 1639 l’Empereur was appointed advisor to the very successful Johan Maurits van Nassau, who was governor of Dutch Brazil from 1637–1644. l’Empereur died in June 1648 very soon after he had begun a course of theology at Leyden. Amongst his closest friends were Daniel Heinsius, the Buxtorffs and Lewis de Dieu, minister of the Eglise Wallon.  Daniel Heinsius and the Buxtorfs spoke very highly of him. He offered at one time to superintend the printing of a Talmudical dictionary in Holland and endeavoured to bring the younger Buxtorf to Leyden who had undertaken to defend the vowel points against Louis Cappel. He was also corresponding with the notable archbishop Usher.

Works
L'Empereur's works are: 
Commentarius ad codicem Babylonicum, seu Tractatus Thalmudicus de mensuris Templi (Leyden, 1630),
 Versio et Notae ad Paraphrasin Josephi Jachiadae in Danielem (Amsterdam, 1633),
 Itinerarium D. Benjaminis in Hebrew and Latin (Leyden, 8 volumes),
 Moysis Kimchi Grammatica Chaldaica (Leyden, 8 volumes),
 Confutatio Abarbanelis et Alscheichi in caput liii Isaiae (Layden, 8 volumes, 1631, in French 1685),
 Commentarius in Tractatum Thalmudicum, qui dicitur Porta, de legibus Hebraeorum forensibus in Hebrew and Latin (Layden, 1637) and
 Commentarius ad Betramum de Republica Hebraeorum (1641, 8 volumes).

References

Sources
 Peter T. van Rooden, Theology, biblical scholarship, and rabbinical studies in the seventeenth century: Constantijn L'Empereur (1591–1648), professor of Hebrew and theology at Leiden (Vol. 6 of the Studies over de geschiedenis van de Leidse universiteit), .
 Alexander Chalmers, The General Biographical Dictionary, "Empereur (Constantine)", Vol. 13, pp. 203, 204. Printed for J. Nichols, 1814.

External links
 Talmudis Babylonici codex Middoth sive de mensuris templi, Elzevir, 1630. Also, here  and here 
 D. Isaaci Abrabanielis et R. Mosis Alschechi Commentarius in Esaiae Prophetiam 30, Elzevir, 1631.
 Itinerarium D. Beniaminis (Travels of Rabbi Benjamin, son of Jonah), ex officinâ Elzeviriana, 1633.

Empereur Constantine
Empereur Constantine
1591 births
1648 deaths
16th-century Latin-language writers
Academic staff of Leiden University
People from Leiden
Empereur Constantine